The following is a partial list of programmes shown in the United Kingdom and Ireland by the TV channel, Cartoonito.

Current programming

Original programming 
 Make, Shake & Jake (Only airs occasionally)

Acquired programming 
 Bugs Bunny Builders (1 November 2022 - present) (Also on Cartoon Network)
 Cocomelon (3 April 2021 – present) (Also on Tiny Pop)
 Fireman Sam (11 February 2008 – present) (Also on Cartoon Network and Channel 5)
 Legends of Spark (11 June 2022 – present)
 Lucas the Spider (2 May 2022 – present)
 Masha and the Bear (20 June 2016 - present) (Also on Tiny Pop)
 Super Wings (6 February 2017 – present) (Also on Tiny Pop)
 Thomas & Friends (6 March 2017 – present) (Also on Channel 5)
 Thomas & Friends: Big World! Big Adventures! (5 April 2021 – present)

Upcoming programming
 Batwheels (March 2023)

Former programming

Original programming 
Original runs:
 Ballooniville
 Cartoonito Karaoke
 Cartoonito Tales
 Go and Be a Grown-Up!
 Go and Get a Grown-Up!
 Ha Ha Hairies
 The Happos Family (2018–2020, originally on Boomerang)
 LazyTown (series 3–4)

Acquired programming 
 A Pup Named Scooby-Doo
 Bananas in Pyjamas (2011-201?) (CGI series)
 Bob the Builder (2016–2022)
 Curious George (2018–2022)
 Care Bears: Adventures in Care-a-lot
 Cave Kids 
 Child's Farm
 Chloe's Closet  (2011-201?)
 Daisy & Ollie (2017–2022)
 Daniel Tiger's Neighborhood
 Dive Olly, Dive
 Mush-Mush and the Mushables (1 March 2022- 24 July 2022)
 The Doozers (2015-2017)
 Paddles! The Huggable Polar Bear (6 September 2021- 24 July 2022)
 Frances
 Hi-5 UK
 Jelly Jamm (5 September 2011 – 17 May 2013)
 Julius Jr.
 Little People
 Loopdidoo
 Miss BG
 Molang (2016–2022)
 Monkey See, Monkey Do 
 Olly the Little White Van (2016-2017)
 Pip Ahoy!
 Popples (1 August 2017 – 2 March 2018)
 Robot Trains (2018–2022)
 Sesame Street  (Autumn 2016–17)
 Simon in the Land of Chalk Drawings
 Strawberry Shortcake's Berry Bitty Adventures (2011-201?)
 SuperTed
 The Adventures of Chuck and Friends
 The Land Before Time
 The Smurfs
 The Time Tunnel
 Tiny Toon Adventures
 Tom & Jerry Kids

Programming upon launch
 Animal Stories
 Baby Looney Tunes
 Barney & Friends
 Bigfoot Presents: Meteor and the Mighty Monster Trucks
 Blanche
 Caillou
 Ellen's Acres
 Firehouse Tales (2007–2013)
 Fluffy Gardens
 Hi-5
 Krypto the Superdog
 Pororo the Little Penguin
 Roobarb and Custard Too

References

Cartoonito
Lists of television series by network
British television-related lists
UK and Ireland
Cartoonito original programming
Cartoon Network-related lists
Warner Bros. Discovery EMEA